DE18 may refer to:
 Delaware Route 18
 
 Vossloh DE 18, a diesel-electric locomotive